The Seventh-day Adventist Church is a major Christian denomination with a significant presence in Colombia with over 275,172 members as of June 30, 2018. The Seventh-day Adventist Church splits Colombia into two Unions.

Sub Fields
North Colombia Union Conference website
Atlantic Colombian Conference website
Caribbean Colombian Conference website
Colombian Islands Mission
East Central Colombian Conference website
East Colombian Conference website
Northeast Colombian Conference website
Southwest Colombian Mission website
West Central Colombian Conference website
South Colombian Union Conference website
Central Colombian Conference website
East Los Llanos Conference
Pacific Colombian Conference website
South Bogata Conference website
South Colombian Conference website
Northwestern Bogata and Boyaca Mission website
South Andean Mission
South Pacific Mission
Upper Magdalena Conference website

Education facilities
The Seventh-day Adventist Church operates 23 secondary schools in Colombia. There is one school of higher education named Colombia Adventist University.

Medical facilities
The Seventh-day Adventist Church operates two clinics in Colombia.

History

See also
Australian Union Conference of Seventh-day Adventists
Seventh-day Adventist Church in Brazil 
Seventh-day Adventist Church in Canada 
Seventh-day Adventist Church in the People's Republic of China
Seventh-day Adventist Church in Cuba
Seventh-day Adventist Church in India 
Italian Union of Seventh-day Adventist Churches
Seventh-day Adventist Church in Ghana 
New Zealand Pacific Union Conference of Seventh-day Adventists
Seventh-day Adventist Church in Nigeria 
Adventism in Norway
Romanian Union Conference of Seventh-day Adventists
Seventh-day Adventist Church in Sweden 
Seventh-day Adventist Church in Thailand 
Seventh-day Adventist Church in Tonga
Seventh-day Adventists in Turks and Caicos Islands

References

Protestantism in Colombia
Colombia
Seventh-day Adventist Church in South America